Airaksinen is a Finnish surname. Notable people with the surname include:

Armi Airaksinen (born 1962), Swedish swimmer
Pekka Airaksinen (1945–2019), Finnish composer
Timo Airaksinen (born 1947), Finnish philosopher

Finnish-language surnames